The women's balance beam gymnastic event at the 2015 Pan American Games was held on July 15 at the Toronto Coliseum.

Schedule
All times are Eastern Standard Time (UTC-3).

Results

Qualification
Amelia Hundley of the United States finished in 7th and Isabela Onyshko of Canada finished in 9th but did they not progress to the final because only two athletes per country can qualify for finals.

Final

References

Gymnastics at the 2015 Pan American Games
2015 in women's gymnastics